Rabbi Chaim Pinchas Lubinsky (August 1, 1915November 28, 1985) was the mashgiach of the yeshiva in Bergen Belsen and the Chief Rabbi of Hanover from 1946 to 1949.

Early life and ancestry
Rabbi Chaim Pinchas Lubinsky was born in Blaszki, Poland on August 1, 1915. His father Rabbi Chiel Meyer Lubinsky was a Rosh Yeshiva in Łódź. His grandfather Rabbi Bunem Menashe Lubinsky had served as the Rabbi of Gąbin.

Mashgiach of the yeshiva in Bergen-Belsen
Rabbi Lubinsky survived the Holocaust and was liberated in Bergen Belsen on April 11, 1945.  Later that year,  Rabbi Gershon Liebman founded a Yeshiva in Bergen-Belsen named "She’eris Yisroel" (the remnants of Israel) and Rabbi Lubinsky was appointed to be the mashgiach of the Yeshiva.

Chief Rabbi of Hannover

In January 1946, the British Chief Rabbi's Religious Council appointed Rabbi Lubinsky to be the Chief Rabbi of Hanover which was located in the British Zone of Germany. Rabbi Lubinsky was assisted in the Rabbinate by Rabbi Shlomo Zev Zweigenhaft. On several occasions, Rabbi Lubinsky was instrumental in permitting agunot to remarry. Rabbi Lubinsky was also appointed to be one of the member Rabbis of the Vaad Harabonim of The British Zone, which was established and led by Rabbi Yoel Halpern.

In the United States
In 1949, the British occupation of North-West Germany ended and the British Chief Rabbi's Religious Emergency Council and its appointees were required to wrap up their operations in Germany. Rabbi Lubinsky then emigrated to the United States.

In 1952, Rabbi Lubinsky was appointed by Rabbi Eliezer Silver to serve as the principal of the "Chofetz Chaim" Jewish day school in Cincinnati, Ohio.

In 1953, Rabbi Lubinsky moved to Brooklyn New York, where he would spend the rest of his life. He was a speaker at several functions hosted by the Agudath Israel of America.

Death
Lubinsky died in New York City on November 28, 1985, and was buried the next day on the Mount of Olives in Jerusalem.

Family
Rabbi Lubinsky was married to Rebbetzin Privah, the daughter of Rabbi Reuven Sender. Privah was murdered during the Holocaust in the Stutthof concentration camp. After surviving the Holocaust, Rabbi Lubinsky married his cousin Rebbetzin Pessah, the daughter of his uncle Menachem Lubinsky, together they had two sons.

Rabbi Lubinsky's sister, Rebbetzin Frieda, was married to Rabbi Shlomo Zev Zweigenhaft.

References

Polish Hasidic rabbis
20th-century German rabbis
1915 births
1985 deaths
American Orthodox rabbis
American Hasidic rabbis
American Haredi rabbis
Rabbis from Ohio
Religious leaders from Cincinnati
Jews and Judaism in Cincinnati
Rabbis from New York (state)
German Hasidic rabbis
Holocaust survivors
Bergen-Belsen concentration camp survivors
People from Borough Park, Brooklyn
People with acquired American citizenship
Clergy from Hanover
20th-century Israeli rabbis
Burials at the Jewish cemetery on the Mount of Olives
Mashgiach ruchani
People from Sieradz County